Saoul Paul Mamby (June 4, 1947 – December 19, 2019) was an American professional boxer who fought between 1969 and 2008.  He held the WBC super lightweight title from 1980 to 1982.

Personal 
Born in South Bronx, New York, Mamby, the child of mother, Victoria, of Spanish descent and father, Robert, from Jamaica, converted to Judaism at age 4. He went to Hebrew School at the Bronx's Mount Horeb Synagogue.

Mamby became interested in boxing while on vacation in Jamaica. He began his boxing career in 1963 at the age of sixteen, fighting in the Golden Gloves in 1965 and 1966. He compiled an amateur record of 25–5 before turning pro in 1969.

Mamby was a soldier in the U.S. Army and served in Vietnam during the Vietnam War in 1968.

Boxing career 

He held the WBC super lightweight title once, starting his -year reign in February 1980 by going to South Korea to stop titlist Kim Sang-Hyun in the 14th round. After that, he made five successful defenses, travelling to Indonesia and Nigeria in the process. He stopped former WBC lightweight champion Esteban De Jesús in the 13th round in July 1980 on the Holmes-LeDoux undercard and decisioned Termite Watkins over 15 on the Holmes-Ali undercard. He won a 15-round nod over Jo Kimpuani on yet another undercard for a Larry Holmes fight against Leon Spinks. He then went to Indonesia to decision Thomas Americo.

In his last bout leaving the ring as champion, he decisioned Obisia Nwankpa in Nigeria.

He was to fight WBA champion Aaron Pryor in the summer of 1982 for a unification bout in the super lightweight division, but instead fought and lost his WBC title by split decision to Leroy Haley in June of that year.

He would play the role of world title challenger twice more, once in a rematch with Haley in February 1983 which he lost in a 12-round unanimous decision. He then challenged new champion Billy Costello in November 1984 but lost another 12-round unanimous decision.

Other boxers Mamby fought include Roberto Durán to whom he lost by points in a non-title fight in 1976, and Saengsak Muangsurin to whom he lost in a 15-round decision in Thailand in 1977 in an attempt to win Muangsurin's WBC  title.

Mamby continued to fight into his 50s, and was forced to retire by the California State athletic commission following his last loss in 2000.

Comeback at 60 
At the age of 60, Mamby announced a comeback which was to have taken place in Lapwai, Idaho at the Pi-Nee-Waus Community Center of the Nez Perce Tribe, in a card that was subsequently canceled.

Mamby fought several weeks later, weighing 149 pounds (67 kilograms) and lost a ten-round decision to journeyman fighter Anthony Osbourne in the Cayman Islands. As a result, Mamby became one of the oldest boxers to appear in an officially sanctioned bout.  It was Mamby's eleventh loss in his last 14 fights.

Mamby was known for his ability to take punches well; in 85 professional bouts, he was stopped only once, that by an opponent who was several years younger, Derell Coley, in 1993.

See also 

 List of WBC world champions
List of select Jewish boxers

References

External links 
 

1947 births
2019 deaths
Boxers from New York City
Military personnel from New York City
Converts to Judaism
African-American Jews
Jewish American boxers
Jewish boxers
Light-welterweight boxers
Welterweight boxers
World light-welterweight boxing champions
World Boxing Council champions
Sportspeople from the Bronx
United States Army personnel of the Vietnam War
American people of Spanish descent
American people of Jamaican descent
American male boxers
United States Army soldiers
Jewish American military personnel
20th-century African-American people
21st-century American Jews